USCGC Kimball (WMSL-756) is the seventh  of the United States Coast Guard. Kimball is named for Sumner Increase Kimball, who was the organizer of the United States Life-Saving Service and the General Superintendent of the Life-Saving Service from 1878–1915.

History
Original planned commission ceremony was on January 19, 2019, but ceremony cancelled due to the government shutdown.

See also
 
 Integrated Deepwater System Program

References

External links

Legend-class cutters
Ships of the United States Coast Guard
2016 ships
Ships built in Pascagoula, Mississippi